Leif Arrhenius (born 15 July 1986 in Provo, Utah) is a professional Swedish athlete competing in the shot put and discus throw. He represented his country at two World and three European Championships. In addition, he is the 2011 US Collegiate Indoor Champion.

Born in Utah, Arrhenius has dual Swedish and American citizenship. He is the son of Anders Arrhenius, who was a professional shot put competitor in Sweden. His older brother, Niklas, is also a shot putter and discus thrower.

Arrhenius represented Brigham Young University from 2005 and 2008-2011. He was a seven-time All-American while competing for Brigham Young University. He was 2011 NCAA indoor champion in the shot put. 

Arrhenius now works for Centennial Middle School in Provo, Utah as the Boys' P.E. Coach.

Competition record

Personal bests
Outdoor
Shot put – 20.50 (Hässleholm 2013)
Discus throw – 64.46 (Växjö 2011)
Hammer throw - 63.62 (Provo, Utah 2014)
Indoor
Shot put – 20.29 (Copenhagen 2013)
Weight Throw-21.56 (Fayetteville, Arkansas 2010)

References

1986 births
Living people
Sportspeople from Provo, Utah
Swedish male shot putters
Swedish male discus throwers
American male shot putters
American male discus throwers
World Athletics Championships athletes for Sweden
American people of Swedish descent
Swedish people of American descent